The quadrifolium (also known as four-leaved clover) is a type of rose curve with an angular frequency of 2. It has the polar equation:

with corresponding algebraic equation

Rotated counter-clockwise by 45°, this becomes

with corresponding algebraic equation

In either form, it is a plane algebraic curve of genus zero.

The dual curve to the quadrifolium is

The perimeter of the quadrifolium is

where  is the complete elliptic integral of the second kind with modulus ,  is the arithmetic–geometric mean and  denotes the derivative with respect to the second variable.

Notes

References

External links
 Interactive example with JSXGraph

Sextic curves